The Yellow Passport is a lost 1916 silent film drama produced and distributed by the World Film Company. Based on Michael Morton's 1914 Broadway play of the same title, it was directed by Edwin August and starred Clara Kimball Young. On the stage the lead characters were played by Florence Reed and John Barrymore. Morton's story was filmed several times in the silent era and made as The Yellow Ticket in 1931 with Lionel Barrymore and Elissa Landi.

A rerelease title for this film was The Badge of Shame.

Plot
Sonia Sokoloff, a young Jewish girl in the Russian Empire, is forced to pretend to be a prostitute to obtain a passport (a "yellow ticket") in order to visit her father, whom she believes to be ill. When she arrives in Petrograd, she learns that her father has been killed. She encounters a young journalist and tells him of the crimes the State perpetrates against its citizens.

Cast
Clara Kimball Young as Sonia Sokoloff
Edwin August as Adolph Rosenheimer
John St. Polis as Fedia
Alec B. Francis as Myron Abram
John W. Boyle as Carl Rosenheimer
Mrs. David Landau as Mrs. Rosenheimer 
Edward Kimball as David Sokoloff
Mrs. E.M. Kimball (Pauline Kimball) as Mrs. Sokoloff 
Thomas Charles	as Fiodor
Florence Hackett as Akulena, Fiodor's Wife
Silas Feinberg as Alex Sokoloff
Robert Cummings as Ivan
Nicholas Dunaew	as Music Master
Adolph Lestina as Chief of Police

See also
 The Yellow Ticket (1918 film)
 The Yellow Ticket (1931 film)

References

External links

1916 films
American silent feature films
Lost American films
American films based on plays
Films directed by Edwin August
1916 drama films
American black-and-white films
World Film Company films
Films about Jews and Judaism
Films set in Russia
Films with screenplays by Frances Marion
Silent American drama films
1916 lost films
Lost drama films
1910s American films